The Auster J/5 Aiglet Trainer was a 1950s British single-engined four-seat high-wing training and touring monoplane built by Auster Aircraft Limited at Rearsby, Leicestershire.

History
Despite its name, the aircraft type had nothing to do with the Auster J/1B Aiglet, it being an aerobatic development of the Auster J/5 Autocar.

The Aiglet Trainer was based on the J/5 fuselage with new wings and stressed for aerobatics. The prototype first flew on 2 June 1951.

Most Aiglet Trainers were bought by private pilots and flying clubs, but 15 went to the Pakistan Air Force, 14 to the Iran Civil Aviation Club and two to the Lebanese Air Force.

Variants

 Auster J/5F Aiglet Trainer – production version.
 Auster J/5K Aiglet Trainer – Blackburn Cirrus Major 3 engine, one built.
 Auster J/5L Aiglet Trainer – de Havilland Gipsy Major 1 engine. 10 built.
 Auster J/8L Aiglet Trainer – J-5K re-engined with a de Havilland Gipsy Major 1 engine.

Operators

Royal Jordanian Air Force

Lebanese Air Force – two aircraft 

Pakistan Air Force – 17 aircraft

Specifications (J/5F)

References
Notes

Bibliography

External links

High-wing aircraft
Single-engined tractor aircraft
1950s British civil utility aircraft
Auster aircraft
Aerobatic aircraft
Aircraft first flown in 1951